Cancer irroratus (common name the Atlantic rock crab or peekytoe crab) is a crab in the genus Cancer.

Distribution

This crab species occurs on the eastern coast of North America, from Iceland to South Carolina.

Description
These crabs are similar in color to, and overlap in size with, the Jonah crab, Cancer borealis. The two species can indeed be distinguished by the purplish-brown spots on the carapace of C. irroratus (contrasting with the yellow spots of C. borealis), and by the smooth edges to the teeth on the edge of the carapace (denticulate in C. borealis).

Fisheries
The rock crab has recently become a popular culinary item. The name "peekytoe crab" refers to the fact that the legs are "picked" (a Maine colloquialism meaning "curved inward"). Until about 1997, they were considered a nuisance species by the lobster industry because they would eat the bait from lobster traps.

References

External links

 Canada Fisheries and Oceans Stock Status Report 2000
 

Cancroidea
Crustaceans of the Atlantic Ocean
Edible crustaceans
Crustaceans described in 1817